Anthony Livesey (born 11 January 1964, in Burnley, Lancashire) is a British journalist and broadcaster who presents 'Drive' for BBC Radio 5 Live.

Early life
Livesey was born in Burnley, Lancashire, and lived in nearby Nelson during the early part of his life. He attended St George's Junior School, Vaughan Street. His mother died aged 44, when he was 13 years old.

Career

Newspapers
Livesey began his career with the Nelson Leader and then worked in the Middle East with Sam Sloan at the Gulf News in Dubai. Returning to his native Lancashire, he worked at the Lancashire Evening Telegraph before spending 18 years with Sport Newspapers where he was editor-in-chief and managing director of the Daily Sport and Sunday Sport newspapers. Livesey's 1998 book Babes, Booze, Orgies and Aliens: The Inside Story of Sport Newspapers recounts some of his experiences working at the organization.

Radio and television

After resigning in August 2006 from the Sport newspapers, he joined the BBC, presenting a Saturday morning show on BBC Radio Lancashire. He then moved on to host the Breakfast show on the station.

Livesey presented the one-off documentary Crumpet: A Very British Sex Symbol, which was transmitted on BBC Two on 28 December 2005 and a year later he presented another programme related to this called Beefcake: A Very British Sex Symbol, which was also transmitted on BBC Two on 27 December 2006.

Livesey also had a brief stint as a quiz show host in 2004 for the BBC. The show was called Traitor and ran on BBC Two, from 9 to 13 February 2004 (5 episodes in 1 series).

On 11 January 2010, Livesey started to present the late night show on BBC Radio 5 Live. Livesey's late night show on 26 September 2011 was the very first to be presented from MediaCity. He was also a stand-in presenter for Shelagh Fogarty and Victoria Derbyshire on their mid-morning shows and occasionally hosted the Breakfast programme. Livesey left the late night show in April 2013 to host the Weekend Breakfast programme and then the weekday Drive programme.

Alongside seven years presenting on BBC North West Tonight, as well as deputising for regular host Roger Johnson, Livesey also presented the North West edition of the BBC's regional football show Late Kick Off and the North West edition of the regional programme Inside Out. Livesey has appeared on Have I Got News for You, What The Papers Say and Never Mind the Buzzcocks, all on the BBC and was the culture reporter on The One Show for a year.

References

External links
 5 Live Drive (BBC Radio 5 Live)
 Press Gazette: Sport editor Livesey resigns
 BBC profile
 Breakfast show gallery
 
 Editor gets complaints

 Tony Livesey Experience Podcast

1964 births
English male journalists
English newspaper editors
English radio personalities
BBC Radio 5 Live presenters
English television presenters
BBC North West newsreaders and journalists
Living people
People from Burnley
People from Colne
People from Nelson, Lancashire
British sports journalists